Simone Bolelli and Fabio Fognini defeated Nicolás Barrientos and Ariel Behar in the final, 6–2, 6–4 to win the doubles tennis title at the 2023 Argentina Open.

Santiago González and Andrés Molteni were the reigning champions, but González chose to compete in Rotterdam instead. Molteni partnered Máximo González, but lost in the semifinals to Barrientos and Behar.

Seeds

Draw

Draw

References

External links
 Main draw

Argentina Open - Doubles
ATP Buenos Aires